Etroga is a genus of bristle flies in the family Tachinidae.

Species
Etroga efetovi Richter, 1995

Distribution
Turkmenistan.

References

Exoristinae
Tachinidae genera
Diptera of Asia
Endemic fauna of Turkmenistan
Monotypic Brachycera genera